Leandro Almeida da Silva (born 14 March 1987), or simply Leandro Almeida, is a Brazilian footballer who plays as a central defender.

Career
Almeida made his professional debut for Atlético Mineiro in a 1–1 home draw against Atlético-PR in the Campeonato Brasileiro on 2 June 2006 and scored his first professional goal for Atlético Mineiro in a 1–2 away defeat to Figueirense in the Campeonato Brasileiro on 8 September 2007.

On 24 June 2009 Leandro Almeida transferred to Dynamo Kyiv.

Honours
Atlético Mineiro
Campeonato Mineiro: 2007

Coritiba
Campeonato Paranaense: 2013

References

External links
 Leandro Almeida at Twitter
 atletico.com.br 
 zerozero.pt 
 Guardian Stats Centre
 Futpédia 
 

1987 births
Living people
Brazilian footballers
Brazilian expatriate footballers
Expatriate footballers in Ukraine
Clube Atlético Mineiro players
FC Dynamo Kyiv players
Coritiba Foot Ball Club players
Sociedade Esportiva Palmeiras players
Sport Club Internacional players
Figueirense FC players
Londrina Esporte Clube players
Paraná Clube players
Campeonato Brasileiro Série A players
Ukrainian Premier League players
Brazilian expatriate sportspeople in Ukraine
Association football defenders
Footballers from Belo Horizonte